Marcel de Sade (born 1934 in Aalborg, Denmark) is the assumed name of Jørgen Vase Larsen, a criminal who passed himself off as a marquis during the 1960s. He was sentenced to jail for embezzlement from the oil company he worked. After his jailtime he worked as a caretaker. He is a piano player and known for his use of extravagant clothing.

Gabriel Axel's role in the 1967 Danish/Swedish comedy film The Reluctant Sadist is loosely based on his life.

References

External links

1934 births
Living people